Uncle Sam's Farm is a song based on a poem by Jesse Hutchinson, Jr., written in 1848 to encourage immigration to the American West.  It was popularized by the Hutchinson Family Singers.  It is part of the Roud Folk Song Index and is number 4556 on the list.

Lyrics

Recordings
  Happy Land: Musical Tributes to Laura Ingalls Wilder

References

American folk songs
Songs based on poems